The women's finweight (−46 kilograms) event at the 2010 Asian Games took place on 17 November 2010 at Guangdong Gymnasium, Guangzhou, China.

A total of fifteen competitors from fifteen countries competed in this event, limited to fighters whose body weight was less than 46 kilograms. 

Huang Hsien-yung of Chinese Taipei won the gold medal after beating Dana Haidar Touran of Jordan in gold medal match 6–3.

Like all Asian Games taekwondo events, the competition was a straight single-elimination tournament. 

The bronze medal was shared by semifinal losers Fransisca Valentina of Indonesia and Sara Khoshjamal Fekri from Iran.

Athletes from Thailand, Malaysia, Nepal and Philippines shared the fifth place.

Schedule
All times are China Standard Time (UTC+08:00)

Results

References

Results

External links
Official website

Taekwondo at the 2010 Asian Games